Murphy Akanji (born 1 December 1977) is a Nigerian former professional footballer who played as a goalkeeper. He most notably played for Sliema Wanderers in the Maltese Football League between 2001 and 2008, and represented the Nigeria national team at the Africa Cup of Nations in 2000 and 2002.

Club career 
Akanji joined Sliema Wanderers from Julius Berger in August 2001, and aspired to make an impression and rapidly travel to a better club in a more significant European league. He was one of the best goalkeepers in the Maltese Premier League throughout his time with the club, although he often mixed flashes of brilliance with beginners' mistakes, making consistency his main flaw. In both 2005–06 and 2006–07 seasons, Akanji won the Goalkeeper of the Year award.

International career 
Akanji was an international goalkeeper and has represented Nigeria at the African Nations Cup.

Honours
Julius Berger
 Nigeria Professional Football League: 2000
 Nigerian Super Cup: 2000

Sliema Wanderers
 Maltese Premier League: 2002–03, 2003–04, 2004–05
 Maltese FA Trophy: 2003–04

Nigeria
 Africa Cup of Nations runner-up: 2000, third place: 2002

Individual
 Maltese Premier League Goalkeeper of the Year: 2005–06, 2006–07

References

External links
 Murphy Akanji at MaltaFootball.com
 

1977 births
Living people
Yoruba sportspeople
Sportspeople from Lagos
Association football goalkeepers
Nigerian footballers
Nigeria international footballers
Nigerian expatriate footballers
Nigeria Professional Football League players
Maltese Premier League players
Niger Tornadoes F.C. players
Sharks F.C. players
Udoji United F.C. players
Bridge F.C. players
Sliema Wanderers F.C. players
Expatriate footballers in Malta
Nigerian expatriate sportspeople in Malta
2000 African Cup of Nations players
2002 African Cup of Nations players